Diane Sher Lutovich (died June 2, 2004) was an American poet, and writing teacher. She was a founding member of Sixteen Rivers Press, a publishing collective based in Northern California.
She was a native of Hibbing, Minnesota.

Awards
 2004 American Book Award

Works
"It’s About Time", "Power of the Ephemeral", Sixteen Rivers Press

Non-fiction

Anthologies

References

Year of birth unknown
2004 deaths
People from Hibbing, Minnesota
American women poets
American Book Award winners
21st-century American women